Luzia Jannie Estrella Dy-Gonzales (born January 25, 1986), widely known as Luane Dy and Luane G., is a Filipino showbiz television personality, model and actress. She is known for being the host of GMA Network's morning television show Unang Hirit where she, along with her co-hosts, received the Best Morning Show Hosts award during the 29th PMPC Star Awards for Television in 2015. She also presents showbiz news on Balitanghali and used to anchor the entertainment news segment Chika Minute on the weekend edition of 24 Oras.

As an actress, she appeared in the ABS-CBN television series The Wedding and Precious Hearts Romances Presents: Somewhere In My Heart. On GMA Network, she starred in I Heart You, Pare! as the girlfriend of Dingdong Dantes and in Genesis.

Early life
Dy was born in Cauayan, Isabela from a Filipino-Spanish and Chinese ancestry.  Her father, William Dy, is pure Chinese and cousin of Filipino politician Ian Dy from the prominent political clan of Isabela while her mother, Thelma Rivera Estrella-Dy, is half-Filipino and half-Spanish. She has two other siblings, an older brother and a younger sister. When she was 14 years old, she along with her mother and her siblings left Isabela and relocated to Quezon City after her parents separated.

Career
At 14 years old, Dy started as a model through joining a model search contest. She also appeared in commercials for various food brands before becoming well-known. During her second year as an accountancy student at Far Eastern University, she became an actress and starred in various shows in ABS-CBN. In 2007, she became the entertainment segment presenter of GMA Network's 24 Oras and in 2010, she joined Unang Hirit as one of the hosts. Dy replaced Grace Lee as an anchor of segment "Star Bites" in Balitanghali, after Lee moved to TV5 In 2012.

In 2017, she became a regular host of Eat Bulaga! The management of Eat Bulaga! has been trying to get her as host in the past but it was not possible due to conflict of schedule, since Balitanghali airs on the same time slot as Eat Bulaga!. After guesting in "Jackpot En Poy" segment of Eat Bulaga!, the management offered her to be a host of Eat Bulaga! and she accepted it. Besides being a host for Eat Bulaga!, she starred on My Carinderia Girl, one of the six 2018 Lenten special of the Eat Bulaga!. She was also part of a web series documenting her temporary off-camera work as location manager for the "Juan for All, All for Juan" segment of Eat Bulaga!.

Personal life
Dy was the former girlfriend of former news reporter Mark Zambrano. In 2010, Dy dated actor Carlo Gonzales, to whom she got engaged by 2019 and got married in November of the same year. They have a son born in May 2020 named Jose Christiano and nicknamed Christ.

Filmography

Television

Film
 Jack Em Popoy: The Puliscredibles (2018) as Ms. Diane "Anne" Dela Paz - Suarez (Montenegro's family drug dealer No. 6 and a corrupt host and police protector)

References

External links 

 
 https://www.gmanetwork.com/sparkle/artists/luanedy

Filipino television journalists
GMA Integrated News and Public Affairs people
GMA Network personalities
Women television personalities
1986 births
Living people
People from Isabela (province)
Actresses from Isabela (province)
Filipino people of Spanish descent
Filipino people of Chinese descent
Women television journalists